Kunturiri (Aymara kunturi condor, -(i)ri a suffix, Hispanicized spelling Condoriri)  is a  mountain in the Andes of Bolivia. It is situated in the La Paz Department, Pacajes Province, Charaña Municipality. Kunturiri lies north-west of the mountain Wayra Lupi Qullu and north-east of the mountain Ch'iyara Salla.

References 

Mountains of La Paz Department (Bolivia)